Gavli Ahir or  Gavli Yadav is a subcaste of the Yadav community, found in the Indian states of Maharashtra and Madhya pradesh. They are referred as Golla in Andhra Pradesh, Telangana and Karnataka. Yadava, 
Konar, Manyani Nair, Golla and Ahir Gawli are considered to be synonymous names. They are distributed all over Maharashtra. Although Reginald Edward has classified Gawlis as sub-caste of many different castes Ahir Gawli (sub-caste of famous Yadav caste of North India) whereas Hanbar Gawli, Singaji Gawli and Lingayat Gawli
are different from Yadav Gawli Ahir Yadav Gawli. Along with Maratha and Kunbis, Ahir Gawlis are considered one of the allied castes of Maratha caste and have been included in the Maratha Regiment in the past.

Origin
the Yadav (Gavli) community claims descent from the Great Yadav families to one of which lord Krishna the eighth incarnation of Vishnu belonged.
The whole of the North India, Gujarat and Deccan were only ruled by the Kings of the Yadav families. They have kept up their Kshatriya caste traditions, customs and occupations. They have given considerable recruits to the government and included in the Maratha regiments.

Sub-groups

While M. S. A. Rao classifies Gavli caste of Konkan region into Dabholis and Chevlis, Siraj-ul-Hassan classifies Gavlis in the Nizam's former Hyderabad state, i.e., Marathwada region, into two divisions, namely Nagarkar and Vajarkar. On the other hand, castes like Dhangar Gavlis, Golla Gavlis, Kuruba Gavlis and Lingayat Gavlis are sub-castes of Yadav/Ahir and Lingayats respectively, These group's are the separate Group from the original Ahir Yadav Gawli community.  Dabholis and Chevlis are localized castes of their respective regions. Gavlis are classified as Other Backward Class in Indian system of reservation.

Lingayat Gavli

They are a sub-group of Lingayats and speak Kannada amongst themselves. They follow Veerashaivism as a religion.

Dabholis and Chevlis

They are a localized caste of Ratnagiri and Colaba region. They claim higher status than all other Gavli sub-groups of Maharashtra. Vithal Krishnaji Khedkar belonged to the Gavli caste of Ratnagiri. He was one of the founding members of the All-India Yadav Mahasabha which was inaugurated in 1924 at Allahabad. He protested against the fact that the Southborough Committee did not consider Yadav Gavlis as Marathas.

Nagarkar and Vajarkar
They are found in the Marathwada region and in some parts of Telangana. Their division into two groups is based on their habitats and modes of life. Nagarkar are those Gavlis who have settled as a pastoralist caste on the edges of villages or towns (nagar). Vajarkar Gavlis are pastoralists who lived in forested areas with better grazing, similar to Dhangar Gavlis who live in the Western Ghats. Vajar is derived from Sanskrit vraja, which means cattle-shed. Both Nagarkars and Vajarkars have no traditions and cannot give any account of their origin, nor of their former settlement. It is possible that they may be an offshoot of Lingayat community. Like other Lingayats, they wear a lingam round their necks and worship it daily with offerings of flowers and food before they dine. They rank higher, socially, than the Maratha Kunbis and are equal to those groups of the Lingayats who have undergone Diksha. They do not eat animal food. They worship Khandoba, Nagoba, Bhavani of Tuljapur, Ganesha and other major Hindu gods.

Dhangar Gavli

Dhangar Gavli, referred as Gavli or Gouly, is a sub-caste of Dhangar caste cluster. They are found in southern Maharashtra, Goa and northern Karnataka. Among Dhangars they are also referred as Dange or Mhaske. They are cattle/buffalo herding pastoral people and practice shifting cultivation. They primarily kept buffaloes because of their ability to defend themselves against panthers and tigers in the traditional habitat as buffaloes are more heavily built than cattle. Hatkars and Gavlis used to be a single group of people in the past with their traditional occupation as cattle herding. Gavlis trace their migration to western ghats from Chaphal via Nanegaon, Kelawali, Irewadi and finally to Sadawaghpur. The migration is believed to have occurred around the 15th century AD. Their subsistence has been primarily on ragi, jowar, buttermilk and some lentils and dried fish. Starting in the 1960s, Gavlis became major suppliers of milk in Pune, Kolhapur and other major regions around their settlement.

In Goa under colonialism, the community shied away from the rest of society as they wanted to escape the grazing tax and ban on Kumeri introduced by the Portuguese Empire. Gavli leaders claim that they had fled to remote hilly and forested areas to avoid religious persecution. They were not part of the Comunidade anywhere in Goa. It is claimed that throughout the Portuguese rule in Goa they were so insulated that not a single Gavli got converted to Christianity.

Mhasoba, Vitthal, Padubai, Ambabai, Banai, Kanhoba (Krishna) and Yelubai (Yellamma) are the major deities of Gavlis. According to some traditions, Banai, wife of Khandoba is Gavli. They consider Vitthal as a Kannadiga Gavli and not Krishna from Dwarka. Vitthal is worshiped alongside his wife Padubai.

Assimilation into Yadav community
In the 1920s, English educated Yadavs emerged in different parts of India, who provided a different kind of leadership. Vithal Krishnaji Khedkar, a Gavli from Maharashtra, along with Ahir leaders of North India founded All-India Yadav Mahasabha (AIYM) in 1924 to promote Sanskritization of Gavli and Ahir community. Dr. Khedkar was born in Bombay on 16 October 1873. His forefathers had been Tehsildars of Khede, a town in Ratnagiri District, his grandfather was in the Bombay Police, and his father was Vithal Krishnaji. AIYM militated cowherds, herdsmen and milksellers all over India to call themselves Yadav, adopt the last name "Yadav", and practice vegetarianism and teetotalism. They claimed that they have descended from the Yadu dynasty of the Puranas, hence the term Yadav, through the Abhira tribe. Lord Krishna, a cowherd, was the hero-god of Abhiras. Based on epigraphy, historian P. M. Chandorkar argued that the Ahirs and Gavlis "should be identified with" the Abhira and Yadava tribes mentioned in ancient Sanskrit works.

Relationship with Deccan Yadavas

The word Yāḍava is formed from yāḍu and yāḍu means Sheep or Goat in Tamil. In the Deccan region, the original worshippers of pastoralist god Vitthal – the Gollas and Kurubas of Andhra Pradesh and Karnataka and Gawlis and Dhangars of Maharashtra, especially southern Maharashtra – are continued to be called "Yāḍavas". Similar to them, several royal families who enhanced the magnificence of Vitthal's worship are called "Yādavas". The difference here is "ḍ" and "d", where "Yāḍavas" represents Dravidian version and "Yādavas" is the Sanskritized version of it. Linguistically this difference is subtle, and so "Yāḍavas" became "Yādavas", i.e., most of these royal dynasties arose from pastoralist groups and took the name Yādava in order to raise their status by connecting themselves with Krishna's clan, Yadu dynasty of the Puranas. They elevated their traditional pastoralist god (Vitthal) into a form of Vishnu-Krishna and accorded high prestige to his worship.

The Seuna Yadava dynasty, which ruled present-day Maharashtra and north Karnataka, arose out of the valorous deeds of Dridhaprahara, founder of the dynasty, who protected cattle. According to the traditional sources, Devagiri, the capital of Seuna Yadavas, was founded by a king who was a Golla/Gavli. The idea that the Seunas were a Gavli dynasty survives to this day in folk traditions of the Nashik-Khandesh area, where they are traditionally called "Gavli Kings". During the reign of Seuna Yadavas and their rival Hoysala Yadavas, the temple of Vitthal at Pandharpur, under their purview, grew from a small pastoral deity site to a major temple complex.

Notable people
 Arun Gawli (born 1955), Indian politician
 Shekhar Gawli (1975–2020), Indian cricketer
 Vandana Gawli, Indian politician
 Sachin Ahir, Politician, Deputy Leader of Shiv Sena in a Maharashtra Legislative Assembly, and Former Minister of State of Government of Maharashtra

References

Bibliography

 
 
 
 
 
 
 
 
 
 
 
 
 

Herding castes
Indian castes